The Koch languages are a small group of Boro-Garo languages a sub-branch of the Sino-Tibetan languages spoken in Northeast India. Burling (2012) calls this the "Rabha group".  They are:
Atong
Koch
Ruga
Rabha

The Rajbongshi, who currently speak an Indo-Aryan language, used to speak a Koch language.

Footnotes

References
 George van Driem (2001) Languages of the Himalayas: An Ethnolinguistic Handbook of the Greater Himalayan Region. Brill.

Sal languages
Languages of India